Alfie Keith Williams (born 20 April 2003) is an English professional footballer who plays as a midfielder for Southern League Premier Division Central club Royston Town, on loan from  club Stevenage.

Career

Stevenage
Williams joined the Stevenage academy after being released by Tottenham Hotspur at under-12 level. Whilst a second-year scholar at Stevenage, Williams was loaned to Biggleswade of the Southern League Division One Central in October 2020, in order to gain first-team experience. He made two appearances during the loan spell, scoring once, before returning to Stevenage when Biggleswade's season was suspended due to restrictions associated with the COVID-19 pandemic. Williams signed his first professional contract with Stevenage on 22 April 2021. Having been an unused substitute in the first team on three occasions, he made his professional debut for Stevenage in the club's 1–0 away victory at Scunthorpe United on 8 May 2021, coming on as an 83rd-minute substitute in the match.

Williams joined Southern League Premier Division South club Kings Langley on a 28-day loan agreement on 10 September 2021. He made seven appearances during the month, scoring once, before the loan was extended for a further two months on 8 October 2021. Williams scored his first hat-trick in senior football in Kings Langley's 5–0 victory against Hartley Wintney on 9 November 2021. He returned to Stevenage in December 2021 having scored six times in 20 appearances in all competitions during the loan agreement at Kings Langley. Williams joined National League South club Hemel Hempstead Town on loan on 24 December 2021. He scored one goal in eight appearances at Hemel Hempstead, before returning to Kings Langley on loan for the remainder of the 2021–22 season. Williams scored three times in seven games during his second loan spell at Kings Langley, which included a goal in a 2–0 victory against Salisbury on the last day of the season to ensure the club avoided relegation by a point.

Ahead of the 2022–23 season, Williams returned to Hemel Hempstead Town on loan until 1 January 2023. Having made five appearances during the first month of his loan spell at Hemel Hempstead, Williams was recalled by Stevenage and sent on loan to Southern League Premier Division South club Hayes & Yeading United on 17 September 2022, on an agreement until 1 January 2023. He made 12 appearances in all competitions for Hayes & Yeading before joining Southern League Premier Division Central club Royston Town on 11 November 2022, on loan until the end of the 2022–23 season.

Style of play
After signing his first professional contract with Stevenage, academy manager Robbie O'Keefe described Williams as "an offensive, flair-type player".

Career statistics

References

External links

2003 births
Living people
English footballers
Association football midfielders
English Football League players
Stevenage F.C. players
Kings Langley F.C. players
Hemel Hempstead Town F.C. players
Hayes & Yeading United F.C. players
Royston Town F.C. players